Kochu Pamba Weir is a diversion dam constructed across Pamba river in Seethathode village of Pathanamthitta district in Kerala, India. It is one of the five dams which are parts of Sabarigiri HydroElectric Project. These are Pamba dam, Kakki dam, Anathode dam, Gavi dam and Kochu Pamba weir  Sabarigiri Hydro Electric Project ( 340 MW) is the second largest hydro electric project of Kerala and is located in Pathanamthitta district. This weir is constructed as a part of Sabarigiri Augmentation Scheme. Water from this reservoir is pumped in to the Pamba reservoir through a pump house located at the downstream of Pamba dam. Taluks through which release flow are Ranni, Konni, Kozhencherry, Thiruvalla, Chengannur, Kuttanadu, Mavelikara and Karthikappally.

Specifications

 Latitude : 9⁰ 17′ 00 ” N	
Longitude: 77⁰ 08′ 30” E	
Panchayath	: Seethathodu	
Village	: Seethathodu
District	: Pathanamthitta
River Basin :	Pamba
River	: Pamba		
Year of completion	
Name of Project	: Sabarigiri HEP
Purpose of Project	Hydro Power	

Type of Dam	Concrete- gravity
Classification	Weir
Maximum Water Level (MWL)	EL 936.18 m
Full Reservoir Level ( FRL)	EL 935.73 m
Storage at FRL	Diversion only
Height from deepest foundation	: 3.65 m ( Height above river bed)
Release from Dam to river	Pamba	Length	52.45 m
Spillway	: Ogee Type; Overflow section- Ungated
Crest Level	EL 935.73 m
River Outlet	1 No. Circular type, 60cm dia

References

Dams in Kerala